Rebecca Immanuel, born Sonja Zimmer (born 1970 in Oberhausen, North Rhine-Westphalia) is a German actress.

Immanuel is married and has a son.

References

External links 
 

1970 births
Living people
People from Oberhausen
German film actresses
German television actresses